The Suffolk Girls & Women's Football League is a women's association football competition run by the Suffolk County Football Association. It sits at level 7 of the women's football pyramid in England.

Clubs
The clubs competing during the 2016–17 season are:

Open Age
Bacton United
Brantham Athletic
Copleston Ladies
East Bergholt United
Ipswich Phoenix
Ipswich Town Ladies
Leiston St Margaret's
Walsham-le-Willows

References

External links
Official website
Suffolk Girls and Women's Football League FA Full Time

7
Football in Suffolk